The Puma Family 16h is a low-power microarchitecture by AMD for its APUs. It succeeds the Jaguar as a second-generation version, targets the same market, and belongs to the same AMD architecture Family 16h. The Beema line of processors are aimed at low-power notebooks, and Mullins are targeting the tablet sector.

Design 
The Puma cores use the same microarchitecture as Jaguar, and inherits the design:
 Out-of-order execution and Speculative execution, up to 4 CPU cores
 Two-way integer execution
 Two-way 128-bit wide floating-point and packed integer execution
 Integer hardware divider
 Puma does not feature clustered multi-thread (CMT), meaning that there are no "modules"
 Puma does not feature Heterogeneous System Architecture or zero-copy
 32 KiB instruction + 32 KiB data L1 cache per core
 1–2 MiB unified L2 cache shared by two or four cores
 Integrated single channel memory controller supporting 64bit DDR3L
 3.1 mm2 area per core

Instruction set support 
Like Jaguar, the Puma core has support for the following instruction sets and instructions: MMX, SSE, SSE2, SSE3, SSSE3, SSE4a, SSE4.1, SSE4.2, AVX, F16C, CLMUL, AES, BMI1, MOVBE (Move Big-Endian instruction), XSAVE/XSAVEOPT, ABM (POPCNT/LZCNT), and AMD-V.

Improvements over Jaguar 
 19% CPU core leakage reduction at 1.2V 
 38% GPU leakage reduction
 500 mW reduction in memory controller power
 200 mW reduction in display interface power
 Chassis temperature aware turbo boost 
 Selective boosting according to application needs (intelligent boost)
 Support for ARM TrustZone via integrated Cortex-A5 processor
 Support for DDR3L-1866 memory

Puma+ 
AMD released a revision of Puma microarchitecture, Puma+, updating the video decoder from UVD 4.2 to 6.0 and the video encoder from VCE 2.0 to VCE 3.1.

Features  
APU features table

Processors

Desktop/Mobile (Beema)

Tablet (Mullins)

References

External links 
 Software Optimization Guide for Family 16h Processors
 2014 AMD Low-Power Mobile APUs 
 Jaguar presentation (video) at ISSCC 2013 
 Discussion initiated on RWT forums by Jeff Rupley, Chief Architect of the Jaguar core
 BKDG for Family 16h Models 00h-0Fh Processors
 Revision Guide for Family 16h Models 00h-0Fh Processors (Jaguar)
 Revision Guide for Family 16h Models 30h-3Fh Processors (Puma)

AMD x86 microprocessors
AMD microarchitectures